James W. Koven (born April 18, 1973 in Morristown, New Jersey) is an American rower.

Koven began rowing as a boarding student at St. Paul's School. He continued rowing as a college student at Brown University where he studied mechanical engineering. Koven became a member of the U.S. Rowing team in 1993 and was a member of the team for eight years, retiring after the Sydney Olympics in 2000. As a national team rower Koven won the World Championships in 1994 in the Men's Heavyweight 8+. In 1996 Koven was in the Men's Heavyweight 8+ that finished fifth. In 1997 Jamie switched from sweep rowing to the single sculls. He trained with Scott Roop, his coach from Brown, and won the World Championships in the Men's Heavyweight 1x in September 1997. In 1998 Koven won the World Cup in Munich and the Diamond Sculls at the Henley Royal Regatta. At the World Championships in Cologne that summer he had an equipment malfunction in the semifinals; he finished 8th in that regatta. Koven continued to row in the single scull through 1999 but moved back to sweep rowing in 2000, competing in the Men's Four at the Sydney Olympics, finishing 5th place. In 2001 Koven competed in the Men's Four that won at the World Cup at Mercer Lake.

Koven retired from rowing after the Olympics in 2000. In the fall of 2010, Koven came out of retirement and began training with the U.S national team in Chula Vista, California.

Koven married Sophie Coquillette on February 20, 1999. They have four children, Lucy, Annabel, Charlie) and Henry.

References 
 
 

1973 births
Living people
People from Morristown, New Jersey
Rowers at the 1996 Summer Olympics
Rowers at the 2000 Summer Olympics
Olympic rowers of the United States
Brown University School of Engineering alumni
World Rowing Championships medalists for the United States
American male rowers
Pan American Games medalists in rowing
Pan American Games gold medalists for the United States
Rowers at the 1995 Pan American Games
Medalists at the 1995 Pan American Games
Stewards of Henley Royal Regatta